Rhinella pombali is a hybrid species of toad from south-eastern Brazil, named after José Perez Pombal, Jr., a Brazilian herpetologist. It was originally described in 2004 as a distinct species, but a genetic study published in 2012 found it to be a hybrid of Rhinella ornata and Rhinella crucifer; it is also morphologically intermediate between these species. It is therefore no longer considered a valid species, although it is still present in some listings.

References

pombali
Amphibians described in 2004
Interspecific hybrids
Taxonomy articles created by Polbot